Sarah Binks is a novel published in 1947 by University of Manitoba professor Paul Hiebert.  The novel is a faux biography of "Sarah Binks", the "Sweet Songstress of Saskatchewan". It satirizes literary pretensions — both of the critic and of the poet — by presenting a poet and critic (the author) whose productions are awash with misreadings and sentimental clap-trap.

Peter Gzowski made Hiebert a frequent guest on his CBC Radio program Morningside and Hiebert thereby became well known across Canada.  Now considered a Canadian classic, Sarah Binks has never been out of print since its original publication in 1947. Its New Canadian Library edition featured an afterword by Charles Gordon.

In 1967, Hiebert produced a sequel Willows Revisited, which, although well-received, did not receive the same level of acclaim as the original novel. The title refers to Willows, the fictional Saskatchewan birthplace of Binks.

Although Hiebert's gentle brand of humour is recognizable to some in Canada, it is not uncommon for Americans to believe Sarah Binks to have been a real person and to excoriate her translations of Heinrich Heine.  Some reviewers have suggested models for Sarah, including Canadian poet E. Pauline Johnson. Hiebert said that his character was not based on any single person.

A small town poet in The Cruelest Month by Louise Penny is compared to Binks.

Awards and recognition
Sarah Binks won the Stephen Leacock Memorial Medal for Humour in 1948.
Sarah Binks was selected for the 2003 edition of  CBC Radio's Canada Reads competition, where it was championed by author Will Ferguson.
The fictitious poet Sarah Binks was awarded the equally fictitious Wheat Pool Medal, described as Saskatchewan's highest poetic honour

References

External links
 Sarah Binks' Translations of Heine

1947 Canadian novels
Canadian humour
Binks, Sarah
New Canadian Library
Novels set in Saskatchewan
Oxford University Press books